Thomas W. Riley (1804? – December 27, 1872) was the twelfth Mayor of Louisville, Kentucky from 1858 to 1859. Riley was a prominent lawyer and member of the Whig Party, elected to the Kentucky General Assembly, serving as Speaker of the House from 1849 to 1850.

Life
His law firm moved to Louisville in 1852. He was elected to the city council in 1855 and 1857. His firm dissolved when he was elected Circuit Court judge in 1857. On May 14, 1858, Riley was elected by the council to fill the position of mayor after William S. Pilcher fell too ill to continue on. Pilcher died on August 14 of that year and Riley served until April 2, 1859.

After his term expired, he returned to practicing law from 1865 to 1870. He died in Bullitt County, Kentucky in 1872.

1872 deaths
Speakers of the Kentucky House of Representatives
Mayors of Louisville, Kentucky
1804 births
Year of birth uncertain
Kentucky Whigs
19th-century American politicians